Aimilios Oikonomidis (also known as Emilios Economides, born 13 January 1959) is a Cypriot sailor. He competed in the Laser event at the 2000 Summer Olympics.

References

External links
 
 

1959 births
Living people
Cypriot male sailors (sport)
Olympic sailors of Cyprus
Sailors at the 2000 Summer Olympics – Laser
Place of birth missing (living people)